Bahr Halvorsen's First Cabinet governed Norway between 21 June 1920 and 22 June 1921. The Conservative and Free-minded Liberal Party cabinet was led by Otto Bahr Halvorsen. It had the following composition:

Cabinet members

|}

State Secretary
Not to be confused with the modern title State Secretary. The old title State Secretary, used between 1814 and 1925, is now known as Secretary to the Government (Regjeringsråd).

References
Otto B. Halvorsen's First Government. 21 June 1920 - 22 June 1921 - Government.no

Notes

Bahr Halvorsen 1
Bahr Halvorsen 1
Bahr Halvorsen 1
1920 establishments in Norway
1921 disestablishments in Norway
Cabinets established in 1920
Cabinets disestablished in 1921